María Eugenia Duarte is a pageant titleholder, was born in Maracaibo, Venezuela on 1967. She is the Miss Venezuela International titleholder for 1988, and was the official representative of Venezuela to the Miss International 1988 pageant held in Gifu, Japan, on June 17, 1988.

Duarte competed in the national beauty pageant Miss Venezuela 1988 and obtained the title of Miss Venezuela International. She represented the Guajira Peninsula.

References

External links
Miss Venezuela Official Website
Miss International Official Website

1967 births
Living people
People from Maracaibo
Miss Venezuela International winners
Miss International 1988 delegates